Eravikulam National Park  is a 97 km2 national park located along the Western Ghats in the Idukki and Ernakulam districts of Kerala in India. The park is situated between 10º05'N and 10º20' north, and 77º0' and 77º10' east and is the first national park in Kerala. It was established in 1978.

Eravikulam National Park is administered by the Kerala Department of Forests and Wildlife, Munnar Wildlife Division, which also runs the nearby Mathikettan Shola National Park, Anamudi Shola National Park, Pambadum Shola National Park, Chinnar Wildlife Sanctuary and the Kurinjimala Sanctuary.

Geography
The main body of the park consists of a high rolling hill plateau with a base elevation of about 2,000 m. The terrain consists of high altitude grasslands interspersed with sholas. Anamudi, 2,695 meters, the highest peak in South India is inside this park. Many perennial streams criss-cross the park. They merge to form tributaries of the Periyar river in the west and of the Cauvery River in the east. The National Park is bordered by the dense Pooyamkutty and Idamalayar forests to the north-west. Lakkom Water falls is in this region.

Fauna

Twenty six species of mammals have been recorded in the park including the largest surviving population of Nilgiri tahr, estimated at 750 individuals. Other local mammal species  lion-tailed macaques, gaur, Indian muntjac and sambar deer. Golden jackal, jungle cat, wild dog, dhole, leopard and tiger are the main predators.  Some little-known animals such as Nilgiri langur, stripe-necked mongoose, Indian porcupine, Nilgiri marten, small clawed otter, ruddy mongoose, and dusky palm squirrel are also found. Elephants make seasonal visits.

132 species of birds have been recorded which include endemics like black-and-orange flycatcher, Nilgiri pipit, Nilgiri wood pigeon, white bellied shortwing, Nilgiri flycatcher and Kerala laughingthrush.

Endemic butterflies confined to the shola-grass land ecosystem like the red disk bushbrown and Palni fourring are among the 101 species in the park. Other montane species include Colias nilagiriensis, and the endemic Telinga davisoni.

19 species of amphibians have been recorded in the park.

New species of frog found
In 2010, a new bright reddish-orange-coloured frog with multiple glands and extremely short limbs was discovered in Eravikulam National Park. The newly discovered species is restricted to less than three km2 on the peak of Anamudi and deserves immediate conservation priority, scientists S.D. Biju of Delhi University and Franky Bossuyt of the Free University of Brussels said in Current Science. The frog has been assigned the name Raorchestes resplendens.
This frog, as compared to all other members of the genus, has multiple prominent glandular swellings: laterally behind the eyes, on the side of the dorsum, on the anterior side of the vent, on the dorsal side of the forearms and shanks, and on the posterior side of tarsus and metatarsus. Additional distinguishing characteristics include the colour of the iris (which is bright red), and extremely short legs.

Flora

Three major types of plant communities are found in the Park – grasslands, shrublands and forests. The terrain above 2000m is covered primarily by grasslands. However, there are numerous small patches of forests in hollows and gullies in these areas. The deeper valleys are extensively forested. Shrublands predominate along the bases of the cliffs and interspersed in rocky slab areas. The antibacterial Eupatorium glandulosum is found here. As this is monate forest vegetation many small mosses, lichen are also found here.

History
Prior to 1971, the area was managed as a game preserve by the Kanan Devan Hills Produce Company. The government of Kerala resumed control in 1971 (Kannan Devan Hill Produce (Resumption of lands) Act, 1971), and declared the Eravikulam-Rajamala Wildlife Sanctuary in 1975 to protect the habitat of the endangered Nilgiri tahr. It became a National Park in 1978.

Gallery

See also 
 List of birds of South India
 Anamudi
 Munnar

References

External links 

National parks in Kerala
Protected areas established in 1978
South Western Ghats montane rain forests
Tourist attractions in Idukki district
Geography of Idukki district
1978 establishments in Kerala
Protected areas of Kerala